Heresy is an album released in 1990 by the dark ambient musician Lustmord. A remastered version was released in 2004.

Track listing

Credits 
Artwork By Front Cover - John Martin, from The Great Day of His Wrath
Artwork By Sleeve Design - Tracey Roberts
Engineer - Andrew Lagowski
Producer Post Production Processing - Chris Carter
Programmed By, Written-by [Sound Design], Remastered By - B. Lustmord

Sleeve Notes 
Liner notes: "Heresy is the culmination of work carried out from 1987 to 1989 and utilizes subterranean location recordings originated within crypts, caverns, mines, deep shelters and catacombs together with material of seismic and volcanic origin. It also takes advantage of psycho-acoustic phenomena and the physical effects of low frequency information."

References

 

Lustmord albums
1990 albums